(born January 15, 1955) is a Japanese actress, voice actress and narrator. She voiced Monkey D. Luffy in One Piece, Ryunosuke Fujinami in Urusei Yatsura, Koenma in Yu Yu Hakusho, Pazu in Laputa: Castle in the Sky, Krillin, Yajirobe and Uranai Baba in Dragon Ball, Kirimaru Settsuno in Nintama Rantarō, Kanna Kirishima in the Sakura Wars series; the titular role of TwinBee in Konami's shoot-'em-up series TwinBee, and MegaMan Volnutt in the Mega Man Legends series and related Capcom crossovers. She received the Kazue Takahashi Award at the 5th Seiyu Awards.

Filmography

Anime

Anime films

Video games

Live-action

Audio dramas

Dubbing roles

Awards

References

External links
  
 
 
 

1955 births
20th-century Japanese actresses
21st-century Japanese actresses
Aoni Production voice actors
Japanese stage actresses
Japanese video game actresses
Japanese voice actresses
Living people
Voice actresses from Tokyo